Borax ( · ) is a borate mineral found in evaporite deposits of alkaline lacustrine environments and as a surface efflorescence in arid regions. It is the chief mineral mined from the deposits at Boron, California and nearby locations, and is the chief source of commercial borax.

Borax first reached Western civilization as tincal mined from deposits in Tibet. The term borax comes from the Arabic bauraq, meaning white.

Occurrences
The most extensive deposits are in Kirka, Turkey. Borax is also mined in the Andes Mountains of Argentina, Bolivia, and Chile. However, the greatest production is from the deposits in California.

Uses
Natural occurrences of the mineral are an important source of commercial borax, which is used for the manufacture of glass fibers, in cleaning agents, as an antiseptic, and as a flux in metallurgy and solvent for metal oxides.

See also
List of minerals

References

Nesoborates
Monoclinic minerals
Luminescent minerals
Minerals in space group 15